Ancistrus taunayi is a species of catfish in the family Loricariidae. It is native to South America, where it occurs in the Uruguay River basin. The species reaches 11.9 cm (4.7 inches) SL and at least 52.3 g (1.84 oz) in weight.

References 

Fish described in 1918
taunayi